Jon Patricof (born 1973) is an American businessman and former president of New York City FC.  Before joining New York City FC, he was President and Chief Operating Officer of Tribeca Enterprises which oversees the Tribeca Film Festival, Tribeca Film, and Tribeca Cinemas.

Early life and education
Patricoff is the son of Susan (née Hatkoff) and Alan Patricof. His aunt and uncle are Jane Rosenthal and Craig Hatkoff. His brother is Jamie Patricof.

Career
Patricof joined Tribeca Enterprises in 2005 as  Chief Operating Officer. He oversaw the development of the Tribeca Film Festival, which was established in 2002, into one of the most prestigious festivals in the world. In 2014, Tribeca Enterprises sold a 50% stake in the Tribeca Film Festival to Madison Square Garden.

On January 6, 2016 it was announced that Patricof would become the third president of New York City FC, taking over the position from Tom Glick.

Personal life
He is married to Victoria Ann Radford of New York. They have three children.

References

External links
Patricof, Alan. Individual Investors Need Tax Breaks, The New York Times, December 4, 1988

Living people
Harvard Business School alumni
20th-century American Jews
1973 births
American chief operating officers
21st-century American Jews